Nottingham, England is an ethnically and culturally diverse city. It is the sixteenth most populous city in the United Kingdom.

Population

Nottingham's total population, according to the 2011 UK census, was 305,680. The population density was 4,073 people per square km.

Ethnicity

The following table shows the ethnic group of respondents in the 1991, 2001 and 2011 censuses in Nottingham. Nottingham is a majority White city with a majority of 71.5%, the largest ethnicity of which is the White British at 65.4% however this majority has been in decline since post-war migration began to the UK. Asian British residents have risen from 5.1% in 1991 to 13.1% in 2011. Black British residents have also risen with the majority of growth coming from Black Africans, going from 4.6% in 1991 to 7.3% in 2011. Mixed and Other ethnicities have also risen as a percentage of the population.

Notes for table above

Ethnicity of school pupils

Languages

The most common main languages spoken in Nottingham according to the 2011 census are shown below.

Religion

The following table shows the religion of respondents in the 2001 and 2011 censuses in Nottingham.

See also

Demography of the United Kingdom
Demography of England
Demography of London
Demography of Birmingham
Demography of Greater Manchester
List of English cities by population
List of English districts by population
List of English districts and their ethnic composition
List of English districts by area
List of English districts by population density

References

Nottingham
Nottingham